The Man with the Blue Post-Modern Fragmented Neo-Traditionalist Guitar (often called simply Blue Guitar) is an album by American singer-songwriter Peter Case, released in 1989. Its title is a reference to the Wallace Stevens poem "The Man With the Blue Guitar."

Guests include Los Lobos, T-Bone Burnett, Ry Cooder, Jim Keltner and David Lindley.

Critical reception

Writing for AllMusic, critic Brian Beatty stated: "Exceptional songs and musical guests, including Ry Cooder and members of Los Lobos and Tom Petty's Heartbreakers, make this... a worthwhile purchase..."

Track listing
All songs by Peter Case unless otherwise noted.
"Charlie James" (Public Domain) – 3:07
"Put Down the Gun" – 3:41
"Entella Hotel" – 4:59
"Travellin' Light" (Case, Bob Neuwirth) – 4:11
"Poor Old Tom" – 3:57
"Old Part of Town" – 4:10
"Rise and Shine" (Case, Victoria Williams) – 4:20
"Two Angels" – 4:33
"This Town's a Riot" – 4:18
"Hidden Love" – 3:08

Personnel
Peter Case – vocals, guitar, piano
Stephen Bruton – mandolin
T-Bone Burnett – background vocals
Ry Cooder  – slide guitar
Dennis Farias – horn
Mitchell Froom – organ, piano
David Hidalgo – 6-string bass, accordion, guitar, bass, ukulele, violin
Jim Keltner – drums, percussion
David Kemper – drums
David Lindley – bouzouki, violin
David McKelvy – harmonica
David Miner – bass
Jerry Scheff – bass
Jack Sherman – guitar
Steven Soles – guitar, bass, maracas, guitar, percussion, background vocals
Benmont Tench – organ
Daniel Timms – keyboards, organ, piano, background vocals
Nick Lane – horn
Michael Bannister – cymbals, drums
Jorge Bermudez – tambourine
John Berry, Jr. – horn, maracas, background vocals

Production
Larry Hirsch – producer, engineer, mixing
Peter Case – producer
Scott Woodman – engineer
Joe Schiff – assistant engineer
Eric Rudd – assistant engineer
Stephen Marcussen – mastering

References

Peter Case albums
1989 albums
Geffen Records albums